James Wright (8 May 1716 – 20 November 1785) was a colonial lawyer and jurist who was the last British Royal Governor of the Province of Georgia.  He was the only Royal Governor of the Thirteen Colonies to regain control of his colony during the American Revolutionary War.

Biography 
James Wright was born in London to Robert Wright Jr, son of Sir Robert Wright, Lord Chief Justice of England.

In 1730 Robert Wright, James Wright's father, accompanied Robert Johnson to the Province of South Carolina and served as its Chief Justice until 1739.  James followed soon after and began the practice of law in Charleston. On 14 August 1741 he entered Gray's Inn in London. In 1747 James was named colonial attorney-general. He also began amassing plantation lands.

Wright returned to London as an agent for the South Carolina colony in 1757. On one of his England visits, or on all of them, he stayed with his cousin William Rugge, the ancestor of the Rugge-Price baronets, on Conduit Street. Then, in May 1760, he was named as Lieutenant Governor to Henry Ellis in Georgia. He returned to America and took up residence in Savannah, Province of Georgia. When Ellis resigned he was appointed Governor in November 1760.  He was the third, and arguably most popular, Royal Governor of the colony. He sold many of his holdings in South Carolina, acquired land in Georgia, and moved his financial operations as well. With peace temporarily established with the French and Spanish, he successfully negotiated with the Indians and the Crown to open new lands to development. In his early administration, the new lands and economic improvement fostered the development of the Georgia colony.

His first troubles came with the Stamp Act of 1765. But, in spite of efforts by the Sons of Liberty to block its implementation, Georgia was the only colony to import and actually use the revenue stamps. In 1768, Wright established the 12,000-acre settlement known as Wrightsboro, Georgia. Wrightsboro was set aside for displaced Quakers from North Carolina and became home to William Few when his family fled North Carolina after their farm had been burned and James Few, William's brother, had been hanged without a trial. As the American Revolution gathered momentum, Georgia remained the most loyal colony—due in part to its recent settlement, with many residents having direct ties through kinship in Great Britain, and, in part as well, to Wright's able administration. Georgia did not send delegates to the First Continental Congress in 1774. That same year saw the death of his wife, Sarah.

By 1775, the revolutionary spirit had reached Georgia through the Committees of correspondence and he dismissed the assembly. But a revolutionary congress met that summer in Savannah and elected delegates to the Second Continental Congress. Then, in early 1776, following the arrival of a small British fleet, rebel forces entered his home and briefly took him prisoner. Wright escaped on 11 February 1776, via Bonaventure Plantation and with the assistance of two compatriots, colonel John Mullryne and Josiah Tattnall (father of future Governor of Georgia, Josiah Tattnall Jr.), to the safety of HMS Scarborough, and sent a letter to his council. The congress and the council adjourned without answering him.

For a time, Wright continued negotiations. He was even able to trade with the rebels to keep his offshore troops and ships supplied. But the differences continued to escalate. When his attempt to retake Savannah with naval forces failed, he returned to England.

By 1778, Governor Wright convinced the government to lend him enough troops to once again attempt to take Savannah. After some short but sharp fights, he regained control of Savannah on 29 December 1778. While never fully in control of the state, he did restore large areas within Georgia to colonial rule, making this the only colony that was regained by the British once they had been expelled. He led a successful defense against several American and French attempts to capture the city. When the war in the North American theatre was lost, he withdrew on 11 July 1782 and retired to England.

Wright's extensive properties were seized by the revolutionary governments in South Carolina and Georgia. He died in London, and is interred at Westminster Abbey.

Wright's offspring 
James F. Cook in his book The Governors of Georgia 1754-2004 states that Sir James Wright (1716-1785) and Sarah Maidman (died 1763) had nine children. They were:

 Sir James Wright (1747–1816), the 2nd Baronet. He married Sarah Williamson Smith, daughter of Captain John Smith and Elizabeth Williamson (other sources such as Burke's Peerage of 1833 incorrectly call her Mary Smith, daughter of John Smith, a former governor of South Carolina) and died without issue.
 Sarah (born 1744), who went with her father Sir James Wright and her brothers James, Alexander, and Charles to Jamaica with other family members, where they were granted land, and later to England to join her father, where she married William Bartram of Norfolk, a Jacobite.
 Alexander (born 1751), who was a Loyalist and lost his American estates. He moved to Jamaica and married Elizabeth Izard, daughter of John Izard and niece of Congressman Ralph Izard. He was the father of Sir James Alexander Wright, the 3rd Baronet and of John Izard Wright, the father of Sir John Wright, the 4th Baronet.
 Charles
 Ann (born 1749), who married British Admiral James Wallace
 Elizabeth
 Charlotte
 Mary (1742–1763)
 Isabella, who married General Thomas Barrow in 1757

Background 
Sir James Wright's mother is traditionally said to be Isabella Pitts, a widow. According to My Zeal for the Real Happiness of Both Great Britain and the Colonies: The Conflicting Imperial Career of Sir James Wright by Robert G. Brooking this is actually an amalgamation of two different women, Robert Wright's wife Alice Johnson Pitt (d. November 1723), the heiress of John Johnson and widow of Baldwin Pitt, Esquire, and Isabella Bulman (d. 21 November 1752), the mother of his children, whom he married one week after the death of his first wife.

According to the Sedgefield marriage registers a Robert Wright did marry an Alicea Pitt on 7 October 1689.

The websites of the Manor House in Sedgefield likewise identifies this person as the son of Sir Robert Wright, Lord Chief Justice of England and his first wife, and adds the information that the groom was 23 years old at the time and the bride 46, and that Alicea died in 1723 aged 80.

Baldwin Pitt is a historical character. He attended Brasenose College at Oxford, matriculated 19 July 1662, aged 16, and was barrister-at-law, Middle Temple, 1673. He was summoned to Parliament in 1674. He was the son of William Pitt the elder of Hartley Wespall, Hampshire, and had a brother, William Pitt the younger, and a sister, Abigail Pitt, who married Ralph Stawell of Netherham, Somerset. According to Debrett's Peerage, the two indeed did marry, and had two sons, William, 3rd Baronet and Edward, 4th Baronet, and four daughters, Elizabeth, married to William Bromley, Esq., Catharine, married to William Higden, D.D., Lucy, and Diana. On the north wall near the door of St. Mary's church, Hartley Wespall, Hampshire, can be found the memorial of Abigail, Lady Dowager of Ralph Lord Stawell, died 27 September 1692, daughter and heir of William Pitt of Hartley Wespall. Above are the arms of Pitt on a lozenge, while on consoles beneath are the arms of Stawell: Gules a cross lozengy argent, and the same impaling Pitt.

According to another old epitaph, Baldwin Pitt died on 10 July 1679, aged 33, and he was indeed married to Alicia, daughter and heiress of John Johnson of Sedgefield.

On a marble in the pavement at the entrance of the quire of the Church of St. Edmund in Sedgefield can be found the following inscription:

Jacerit sub hoc marmore exuviæ Baldwini Pitt de Agro Hamptoniensi Armr. nobilis et antiquæ Familiæ Constans Ecclesiæ Anglicanæ Et Regiæ Majestatis Asserto IIngenium acre Judicium Subactum Memoriam tenacem habuit Christiane ac pie 10mo die julij Anno Salutis 1679 Ætatis 33 tradidit Corpus solo animam cælo Posuit hoc illi conju[n]x tristissima Alicia Filia et hæres Johannis Johnson de Sedgefeild genr. pia Expectatione Æternæ glori
Arms: Sable, a fesse chequy, Argent and Azure, inter three bezants, Pitt; impaling, a bend charged with three pheons inter two towers. On a chief a demi-lion rampant inter two lozenges, Johnson.

Baldwynus Pitt married Alicia Johnson at Durham on 14 August 1676.

In the Church of St. Edmund in Sedgefield, there can also be found a baptismal font, perhaps not an unusual place for it, but the unusual thing is that it is of two dates, the earlier, or 15th-century portions, consisting of a broad octagonal step, base, and shaft of Frosterley marble, and the later of an elaborate bowl of grey Italian marble dating from the rectorate of the Rev. Theophilus Pickering, D.D. (1705–11). On each of the eight sides is carved a shield of arms, one of which, facing north-west, is the coat of Dr. Pickering, who was probably the donor. The other shields bear the arms of his contemporaries and predecessors, and are as follows: east, Lawson; south-east, Butler of Oldacres; south, Thornton impaling Greystock; south-west, Hoton; west, Elstob; north, Wright impaling Johnson; north-east, Lambton impaling Wright. «The font is a handsome octagonal basin of black marble. Each face bears an armorial shield. 1. Ermine, a lion rampant, Pickering, quartering .... three garlands, .... 2. A fleur de lis, Elstob of Foxton. 3. A chevron inter three trefoils, Hoton of Hardwick. 4. A chevron and chief indented, Thornton; impaling, two bars, over all three chaplets, Greystoke. 5. A chevron inter three covered cups, Butler of Oldacres. 6. A chevron inter three birds? ..... 7. A. fesse inter three lambs passant, Lambton of Hardwick; impaling Wright, as below. 8. A chevron engrailed, inter three fleurs de lis, on a chief three spear heads, Wright of Sedgefield; impaling, a bend charged with three pheons, inter two towers, on a chief a demi-lion rampant, inter two lozenges, Johnson. The preservation of the old coats of Hoton and Thornton (fn. 8), as well as the handsome design of the font, seem to prove that it was copied or restored from some ancient basin of the same form.» «8. The latter coat fixes the date of the old font to the life-time of Roger Thornton, the wealthy merchant of Newcastle, and owner of Bradbury and the Isle, who married a daughter of Lord Greystoke, and died in 1469, leaving an heiress, wife to George Lord Lumley. William Hoton was the contemporary owner of Hardwick. The other six coats fix the restored font to the time of the kindly and munificent rector Pickering, with four of the five principal gentry of the parish, Lambton, Wright, Butler, and Elstob. Conyers of Layton was a Roman Catholic.» Now, Freville Lambton of Hardwick did marry Judge Robert Wright's daughter Anne, so that should prove that someone from the same Wright family married someone from Alicia's Johnson family. Unfortunately for these purposes, the coat of arms of the Wright family of Kilverstone and the coat of arms of the nearby Wright family of Sands in Segdefield are virtually identical. But it does make it extremely likely that the second marriage of Alicia Pitt, daughter of John Johnson of Sedgefield, was to a Robert Wright of either of these two families.

On 27 November 1723 Alicea Wright, of Sedgfield, wife of Robert Wright (armigeri [knight]) was buried at the Church of St. Edmund in Sedgefield.

A further deep dive into Durham records reveal that in Marriage Bonds, Durham Diocese, on 10 August 1676 Baldwin Pitt (esquire, of Middle Temple, [St. Dunston, London]) obtained a licence to marry Alice Johnson (of [Sedgefield]), directed to Durham Cathedral. Surety: William Newhouse, gentleman. [Note: married 14 August at Dutham Cathedral. ], and that at Durham Cathedral (Church of Christ & Blessed Mary the Virgin) 14 August 1676 Baldwynus Pitt (armiger) married Alicia Johnson. And that likewise, in Marriage Bonds, Durham Diocese, on 4 October 1689 Robert Wright (esquire, of Middle Temple, Middlesex) obtained a licence to marry Alice Pitt (widow, of [Sedgefield]), directed to Sedgefield. Surety: William Stagg. [Note: married 7 October at Sedgefield.] At St. Edmund the Bishop in Sedgefield, on 7 October 1689 Robertus Wright (Ar.) married Alicea Pitt (vid [widow]), by licence. [Note: the "Ar." after the groom's name might be for "armiger" - in this period, that is one of the few occupations that are listed in this register.]

Armiger or armigeri does not appear to translate to knight, but seems to mean a person entitled to bear a coat of arms. According to one source, in the seventeenth century specifically Armiger was used strictly as a translation of the title Esquire, as a title of honour, and was restricted to certain classes of men, the younger sons of noblemen; the eldest sons of knights; barristers-at-law; and the holders of certain offices of state, as opposed to generosus, which was the translation for gentleman. Alicia's father, for example, is given the title generosus in the epitaph (the suffix genr after his name), and clearly their family had the right to bear arms, as the Johnson coat of arms is depicted on the epitaph.

The Middle Temple is one of the four Inns of Court exclusively entitled to call their members to the English Bar as barristers. Legal training does seem like it would be an advantage to someone who would go on to be a judge, even in the colonies.

Robert Wright's Alumni Cantabrigienses entry in Venn reads as follows:

WRIGHT, ROBERT. Adm. Fell.-Com. (age 17) at CAIUS, June 4, 1683. S. of Sir Robert (1651), Serjeant-at-law, of Wangford, Suffolk. B. in London. School, Eton. Matric. 1683–4. Adm. at the Middle Temple, June 11, 1683. Called to the Bar, 1687. Chief Justice of South Carolina, 1730. Died before Oct. 1748. (Venn, I. 473.)

A register of admissions to the Middle Temple from 1650 to 1750 seems to contain precisely two Robert Wrights, both admitted in 1683. Robert Wright, son and heir of Thomas Wright of Downeham, near Brand, Suffolk, esq., and the Robert Wright who was the father of Sir James Wright. The one from Downeham, near Brand, Suffolk, also attended Cambridge, and his Alumni Cantabrigienses entry in Venn mentions that he married 1) Anne, daughter of Sir George Wenyeve, of Brettenham, Suffolk; 2) Dorothy Dockham, widow, and that he had at least one son. There is seemingly nothing connecting him with Alicia, Sedgefield, Durham, or any of the two Wright families the coat of arms on the baptismal font could have belonged to.

However, according to one pedigree, to complicate matters further, this second Robert Wright also belonged to the Kilverstone line, the two Robert Wrights were second cousins, the Robert Wright who was the father of Sir James Wright was the grandson of Jermyn Wright of Wrangford in Suffolk who married Anne Blatchford, while the second Robert Wright at the Middle Temple was the grandson of his brother John Wright of West Lexham and Ovington in Norfolk and Joan Steward. Their mutual great-grandparents were Thomas Wright of Kilverstone and Jane Jermyn.

The pedigree as well as Stemmata Chicheleana with Burke concurring give him three sons, however, with Anne Wenyeve. According to Alumni Cantabrigienses the middle one of these sons, Robert, was born in or about 1696, and he married his second wife Dorothy Dockham on 2 December 1703 at St. Olave's Church, Old Jewry, making it unlikely that it was this second Robert Wright of the Middle Temple who married Alicia in 1689.

Burke describes in 1835 the son of Sir Robert Wright, chief justice of the Court of King's Bench, as «Robert, of Sedgfield, in Durham, who emigrated to South Carolina, and married a widow lady named Pitts.» He adds that the present baronet is descended from this marriage.

He is described as Robert Wright, Sedgfeild, Bishoprick of Durham, Esq. in the marriage settlement of his sister Elizabeth in 1692.

The Alice (1672 –  17 November 1724) and her husband John Ball (d. 5 January 1732) who are buried in an altar tomb in the Church of St. Edmund, Sedgefield, the same church that Baldwin Pitt is buried in, are the sister and brother-in-law of Robert Wright. John Ball was also his first cousin through their mothers. Alice Wright and John Ball had been married on 8 April 1706 at St. Stephen Walbrok, City of London, a year before the Manor House of Sedgefield was finished in 1707, based on the sundial on the front of the Manor House showing the year that the house was completed. Ean Parsons writes that the Manor House of Sedgefield is in the style of (but does not attribute it to) Sir Chrisopher Wren. Sir Christopher Wren (30 October 1632 – 8 March 1723) was the first cousin of Susan Wren, the mother of Robert and Alice, and of Anne Wren, the mother of John Ball. Ean Parsons expresses amazement at the need for such a large mansion for a family unit at this time seemingly consisting of only Robert Wright and Alicia, and after eighteen years of marriage. John Ball had at the time three small sons by his first wife Frances Watts (another cousin, her mother was Mary Wren). John (b.1701), George (b.1703) and Francis (b.1704). There is a memorial to Frances and her infant son Edward in St. Mary's Parish Church, Hampton, where all of her children were baptised. In his will he mentions all three of them, by name and in the correct birth order, so they lived to be grown men, and would have been small children at the time of his second marriage. The youngest would have been two, the eldest five years old. He also had an unmarried sister, Anne. John and Alice Ball's final resting place, the Church of St. Edmund, Sedgefield, is directly vis-à-vis the Manor House of Sedgefield. In the first half of the 1700s there would have been no buildings in between them. To the west there were open fields across to the Hardwick Estate, owned by Robert and Alice's sister Anne's (d.1731) husband Freville Lambton (8 January 1661/2 – 1731). As an unmarried woman in the 1600s and the early 1700s it is exceedingly likely that Alice lived with a family member until her marriage. Her father had died in 1689, and her mother had pre-deceased him. (He had been married again to another woman since.) It is quite possible that the family unit for those eighteen years had consisted of Robert Wright, his wife Alicia, his sister Alice, his sister Elizabeth until her marriage in 1692, and his sister Anne until her marriage in 1695. And Anne did not move very far away.

Quite possibly the household since 1694 also included his widowed sister Susan, who had been married in Westminster Abbey in 1687, but lost her husband Vertue Radford in 1694. She was probably living with her sister Anne in 1730, when, on 12 April, Susanna Radford, of Hardwick, widow, generosa [gentlewoman] was buried at Sedgefield.

A letter ostensibly from one of their new neighbours in the New World, written at Charles Town January 21st 1725 from Elizabeth Hyrne to her brother Burrell Massingberd, has this to say about the arrival of the Wright family:

Here is laitly arrived in this provence one Mr Robert Wright a gentleman of large family both of sons and daughters they apear to be very genteel people and to have a good substance it is said they have now 4 or 500 pounds in England at a place cald Sagefeild near Newcastle that he has been a member of the English Parliament, he has brought over a coach averall servants in livery, what was his reason for leaving England I cannot tell some say his father was a judge in King James’s reign and that he being a non-juror was weary of heavy taxes but I believe they indever to keep it privett be it so or not however he is like to make a good settler he has bought a large plantation with some buildings upon it upon Ashley river and has paid a great deal of money for it if you know of anything of him lett me know in your next

According to Colonial America the appointment of Robert Wright as a judge in South Carolina was on 27 May 1725.

In 1727, the Wrights were well-established in South Carolina, when Robert Wright, Jr. (Sir James's brother) married the sixteen-year-old heiress Gibbon Cawood without the permission of her mother or her guardians.

Robert G. Brooking writes in Zeal for the Real Happiness of Both Great Britain and the Colonies: The Conflicting Imperial Career of Sir James Wright that «Wright had been sent to South Carolina in 1725 "by [Lord Proprietor John] Cotton to establish those people in their disaffection caused by the ill behavior of Lds Proprietors."» The websites of the Manor House in Sedgefield writes that:

Following the departure of Robert Wright to Carolina in 1724 his mansion house in Sedgefield lost its purpose.  Robert left behind him a confusing legacy of claims to the title.  The house was built on land owned by the Bishopric of Durham within the property of the Lord of the Manor of Middleham and after 1724 a number of people made claims to the title including John Cotton a Lord Proprietor of Carolina who no doubt helped arrange Robert’s move to the New World.  There were four claimants in all and there is no doubt their interest was pecuniary rather than in the property itself.  The house’s future was not resolved until 1756 in the Royal Court of Chancery of London.  It was sold to the highest bidder who was John Burdon who had bought Hardwick Estate from the Lambton family in 1748.

Certainly legal entanglements seem to have ensued.

John Cotton (1671-1736) of the Middle Temple, Carolina Lord Proprietor, was the second son of John Cotton of Ashill, Norfolk, by Anne, daughter of Jermyn Wright of Wangford, Suffolk, sister of Sir Robert Wright, Chief Justice of the King’s bench. He was the first cousin of Robert Wright, Chief Justice of South Carolina. He married Elizabeth, the second cousin of them both, daughter of John Wright (1645–1728), merchant tailor of London, and his wife Anna-Maria Smith (1652–1714). Elizabeth's brother Robert Wright married Elizabeth Rayney, daughter of Henry Rayney (d.1740) of London and Tyers Hill and Frances Wright, the sister of the abovementioned Robert Wright of Downham and also a Kilverstone Wright. Their sister Martha was the wife of Henry Partridge. The daughter of Elizabeth Wright and John Cotton, Elizabeth Cotton, married Sir John Tyrrell, 3rd Baronet (1685 – 21 June 1729), one of the Lords Proprietors of Carolina. Tyrrell County, North Carolina is named after him. He himself was a distant relation of the preceding.

At least two records exist of the marriage of Robert Wright, widower, and Isabella Bulman, a spinster from St. Giles in the Fields, a bond from 4 December 1723, and an allegation from 11 December 1723. However, in the allegation, Robert Wright is said to be 40 years old, which means that he would have been born in or about 1683. We know that Robert Wright was older than that, not least because that means that he would have been six years old at his marriage to Alicea in 1689. Isabella Bulman is said to be 26 years old, which means that she would have been born in or about 1697. Isabella Wright had given birth to a child by at least 1703, so that seems unlikely also.

According to the Dictionary of National Biography, 1885-1900, Volume 63, Sir James Wright was «born in Russell Street, Bloomsbury, on 8 May 1716» as «the fourth son of Robert Wright of Sedgfield in the county of Durham, who removed from England to Charleston, and for many years was chief justice of South Carolina. Robert, son of Sir Robert Wright [q. v.], lord chief justice of England, married Mrs. Pitts, whose maiden name was Isabella Wright.»

The Magna Charta Sureties also mention the widow Isabella Pitts, confirm the death date of Isabella Wright as 21 November 1752, but adds that she was 77 years old at the time.

According to Extracts from South Carolina Gazette, on November 27th, 1752 On Tuesday morning, the 21st instant, died in the 78th year of her age, Mrs. Isabella Wright, Relict of the late Hon. Robert Wright. Esq., Chief Justice of this Province. The same source also adds that on November 24. 1739.— On the 12th of last month, died the Hon. Robert Wright. Esq. late Chief Justice of this Province. Chief Justice Wright died in a yellow fever outbreak in 1739.

Legacy
Wright Square in Savannah, Georgia, is named in his honour.

External links
 
 Burke's Peerage and Baronetcy, 1839;
 Foster's Admission Registers of Gray's Inn, p. 375;
 Jones's Hist. of Georgia, 1883, vol. i.
 Jones's Hist. of Georgia, 1883, vol. ii. passim;
 Collections of Georgia Hist. Soc., 1873, iii. 157–378;
 Stevens's Hist. of Georgia, 1859, vol. ii. passim;
 m'Call's Hist. of Georgia, Savannah, 1811–16; Volume I
 m'Call's Hist. of Georgia, Savannah, 1811–16; Volume II
 White's Hist. Collections of Georgia, New York, 1855, pp. 188–96;
 Bartram's Travels through North and South Carolina, Georgia, and Florida, 1792, pp. 4, 35;
 Sabine's Loyalists of the American Revolution, 1864;
 Chester's Registers of Westminster Abbey, 1876, p. 440

References 

1716 births
1785 deaths
British emigrants to the Thirteen Colonies
British officials in the American Revolution
Burials at Westminster Abbey
Colonial governors of Georgia (U.S. state)
Loyalists in the American Revolution from Georgia (U.S. state)
Politicians from London
Lawyers from London
South Carolina Attorneys General